Gökhan Gül (born 17 July 1998) is a German footballer who plays as a defensive midfielder or centre back for Gençlerbirliği.

Club career
He left Fortuna Düsseldorf upon the expiration of his contract on 24 May 2021.

International career
Gül was born in Germany and is of Turkish descent. He is a youth international for Germany, having played up to the Germany U-20s.

Career statistics

Honours
Individual
 Fritz Walter Medal U19 Bronze: 2017

References

External links

1998 births
Living people
German footballers
Germany youth international footballers
Association football defenders
People from Castrop-Rauxel
Sportspeople from Münster (region)
VfL Bochum players
Fortuna Düsseldorf players
SV Wehen Wiesbaden players
Gençlerbirliği S.K. footballers
2. Bundesliga players
3. Liga players
German people of Turkish descent
Footballers from North Rhine-Westphalia